The 1921 Lippe state election was held on 23 January 1921 to elect the 21 members of the Landtag of the Free State of Lippe.

Results

References 

Lippe
Elections in North Rhine-Westphalia